Liliana Santos (born 22 September 1980) is a Portuguese actress and model.

Career
As a model she has been cover girl for several men's magazines, such as the Portuguese editions of  Maxim and GQ.

As an actress she participated in "Queridas Feras" (2004), "Maré Alta" (2004), "Morangos com Açúcar" (2004), "Inspector Max" (2004), "Ninguém Como Tu" (2005), "Câmara Café" (2006), "Floribella" (2006), "Chiquititas" (2007), "Resistiré" (2008) and "Podia Acabar o Mundo" (2008).

Later she was one of the hosts of Portuguese music show "TOP +" and a reporter for "Factor M", a talk show hosted by Merche Romero, both in RTP.

She starred as Raquel in the philosophical drama "Second Life" (2009), from director Miguel Gaudêncio.

External links
 

1980 births
Living people
Portuguese television actresses
[[Category:Actreses from Lisbon
Inspector Maxim e Boneco]]

{{Portugal-actor-stub
insert dial up lock
}}